Moraea vuvuzela is a plant named after the noisy trumpet, vuvuzela. Moraea is a genus of plants in the family Iridaceae.

References

vuvuzela
Taxa named by Peter Goldblatt
Taxa named by John Charles Manning